Noci is a city and comune in the Metropolitan city of Bari in the region of Apulia, in southern Italy. It has about twenty thousand inhabitants. Established during the Norman time in Italy, the town developed during the Angevin period. On a west to east line it is located between Gioia del Colle and Alberobello. Most buildings in the town are built in a traditional style and are packed together with few open spaces.

References

External links
 Official website

Cities and towns in Apulia